Sébastien Perrier (born 19 March 1987) is a French ski mountaineer.

Selected results 
 2008:
 4th, World Championship, relay, together with Nicolas Bonnet, Martial Premat and Adrien Piccot
 2010:
 3rd (espoirs), Trophée des Gastlosen (ISMF World Cup), together with Xavier Gachet

External links 
 Sébastien Perrier at skimountaineering.org

References 

1987 births
Living people
French male ski mountaineers
21st-century French people
20th-century French people